Louise C. Showe, Ph.D., is a researcher and scientific director of the Genomics Facility and the Bioinformatics Facility at The Wistar Institute in Philadelphia. Her research focuses on functional genomics and how they can be used to better understand the immune system and cancer.

Showe has said that being able to "globally screen gene expression patterns using genomics and proteomics appears to have injected a new level of enthusiasm for learning what is going on in complex cancers that have been particularly recalcitrant to therapy." Recently, Showe's research led to the creation of a blood test that could be used to test for lung cancer using a 29-gene assay. The company OncoCyte has partnered with Wistar to develop lung cancer diagnostic tests.

Select publications
 Fedorov VB, Goropashnaya AV, Toien O, Stewart NC, Chang C, Wang H, Yan J, Showe LC, Showe MK, Barnes BM., Modulation of gene expression in heart and liver of hibernating black bears (Ursus Americanus)., BMC Genomics. 2011 Mar 31;12:171.
 Negorev DG, Vladimirova OV, Kossenkov AV, Nikonova EV, Demarest RM, Capobianco AJ, Showe MK, Rauscher FJ, Showe LC, Maul GG., Sp 100 as a potent tumor suppressor: accelerated senescence and rapid malignant transformation of human fibroblasts through modulation of an embryonic stem cell program., Cancer Research. 2010 Dec 1;70(23):9991-10001.
 Lu F, Wikramasinghe P, Norseen J, Tsai K, Wang P, Showe L, Davuluri RV, Lieberman PM., Genome-wide analysis of host-chromosome binding sites for Epstein-Barr virus Nuclear Antigen 1 (EBNA1)., Virology J. 2010 Oct 7;7(1):262.
 Sun H, Wu J, Wickramasinghe P, Pal S, gupta R, Bhattacharyya A, Agosto-Perez FJ, Showe LC, Huang TH, Davuluri RV., Genome-wide mapping of RNA Pol-11 promoter usage in mouse tissues by ChIP-seq., Nucleic Acids Research. 2010 Sep 14.
 Iizasa H, Wulff BE, Alla NR, Maragkakis M, Megraw M, Hatzigeorgiou A, Iwakiri D, Takada K, Wiedmer A, Showe L, Lieberman P, Nishikura K., Editing of Epstein-Barr-virus-encoded BART6 microRNAs controls their dicer targeting and consequently affects viral latency., Journal of Biological Chemistry. 2010 Oct 22;285(43):33358-70.

References

External links
Dr. Showe's lab page on The Wistar Institute's website

Cancer researchers
Living people
Year of birth missing (living people)